Gösta Gustafson (15 November 1886 – 19 January 1963) was a Swedish stage and film actor.  He acted prolifically in the theatre and on screen for several decades.

Selected filmography

 The People of Simlang Valley (1924)
 The Counts at Svansta (1924)
 Ingmar's Inheritance (1925)
 The Girl in Tails (1926)
 Sealed Lips (1927)
 Sin (1928)
 The Strongest (1929)
 Ulla, My Ulla (1930)
Love and the Home Guard (1931)
 Colourful Pages (1931)
 Hotel Paradis (1931)
 Tired Theodore (1931)
 Synnöve Solbakken (1934)
 He, She and the Money (1936)
 The Pale Count (1937)
 A Cruise in the Albertina (1938)
 Adolf Saves the Day (1938)
 Art for Art's Sake (1938)
 A Girl for Me (1943)
 The Old Clock at Ronneberga (1944)
 The Girl and the Devil (1944)
 I Am Fire and Air (1944)
 The Journey Away (1945)
 The Rose of Tistelön (1945)
 Harald the Stalwart (1946)
 The Bells of the Old Town (1946)
 Lars Hård (1948)
 Åsa-Nisse (1949)
 The White Cat (1950)
 The Quartet That Split Up (1950)
 U-Boat 39 (1952)
 The Clang of the Pick (1952)
 Barabbas (1953)
 Unmarried Mothers (1953)
 All the World's Delights (1953)
 The Girl from Backafall (1953)
 Storm Over Tjurö (1954)
 Our Father and the Gypsy (1954)
 Darling of Mine (1955)

References

Bibliography
 Soister, John T. Conrad Veidt on Screen: A Comprehensive Illustrated Filmography. McFarland, 2002.
 Steene, Birgitta. Ingmar Bergman: A Reference Guide. Amsterdam University Press, 2005.

External links

1886 births
1963 deaths
Swedish male film actors
Swedish male silent film actors
Swedish male stage actors
People from Gothenburg
20th-century Swedish male actors